This list of universities in Istanbul lists the universities within the city limits of Istanbul.

Public universities

Private universities

Private vocational schools

Related lists

List of schools in Istanbul
List of libraries in Istanbul
List of universities in Turkey

References

Universities and colleges in Istanbul
Istanbul-related lists
Lists of buildings and structures in Turkey
Universities in Istanbul
Istanbul